Magnetic Soil is the seventh studio album by pioneering jazz group Soil & "Pimp" Sessions, from Japan. It was released on October 5, 2011.

Track listing

Credits
Performed and arranged by Soil & "Pimp" Sessions
Toasting [Agitator] – Shacho
Saxophone – Motoharu
Trumpet – Tabu Zombie
Piano – Josei
Bass – Akita Goldman
Drums – Midorin
Additional musicians - Maia Hirasawa (vocal on track 3), Seiji Fukuwa (Percussion on track 7)
Mastered by Yasuji Maeda (Bernie Grundman Mastering)
Recorded and mixed by Shinjiro Ikeda (except track 8), Kiyoshi Kusaka (track 8)
Executive Producer – Minoru Iwabuchi, Naoki Toyoshima (Victor)
Assistant Engineers – Hiromitsu Takasu, Takamitsu Kuwano, Ryota Hattanda, Shu Saida (Victor Studio), Yasuhiro Nakajima (Heart Beat Recording Studio)
A&R, Director – Yuichi Sorita (Victor)
Public Relations - Toyonobu Hatayama (Victor)
Artist Management - Yuka Goto (Victor)
Promotion Staff - Satoshi Yamagami, Yohei Suzuki, Junko Yamamoto, Aya Koizumi, Tsubasa Sato (GMpV / Victor)
Artwork by 'HATCH' Hachinohe
Photography - Rui Hashimoto (Sound Shooter)
Design – Satoshi Suzuki
Creative Coordination – Tomoro Watanabe (Lodge ALASKA)

References

2011 albums
Soil & "Pimp" Sessions albums